"Should the Woman Pay?" is the 13th television play episode of the first season of the Australian anthology television series Australian Playhouse. Originally aired on ABC on 11 July 1966

Premise
A husband returns home after a long absence to find a lover living with his wife. He decides to stay and insist his wife support him.

Cast
 Wynn Roberts as the husband
 Marcella Burgoyne as the wife
 Brian Burton as the lover
 Ray Angel
 John Paton

Reception
The TV critic for The Sydney Morning Herald thought the central situation "was as light and idle as its background of discreet dinner dance music... Although the play's triviality was not enhanced by any notable show of wit the author has capably dressed up the little plot, with dialogue which consistently keeps the note of casual comedy. Most of the entertainment came from the delightfully relaxed acting of Wynn Roberts."

The Age said the story "was thin, and at times rather obscure" but praised Roberts' performance.

References

External links
 
 

1966 television plays
1966 Australian television episodes
1960s Australian television plays
Australian Playhouse (season 1) episodes